Rory Christopherson (born 14 September 1988) is a New Zealand cricketer. He played in two first-class and three List A matches for Northern Districts in 2014.

See also
 List of Northern Districts representative cricketers

References

External links
 

1988 births
Living people
New Zealand cricketers
Northern Districts cricketers
Cricketers from Whanganui